The Arica Department was a territorial division of Chile that existed between 1884 and 1929. It was ceded by the Treaty of Ancón in 1883 and placed under military administration, and then created on the 31st of October 1884, as one of the three departments of the Tacna Province, and was returned to Peru at midnight on the 28th of August 1929, under the terms agreed upon in the Treaty of Lima of the same year.

History
The province was first established on October 31, 1883 by a law promulgated by President Domingo Santa María which defined its limits as the Tacna Province to the north, the Quebrada de Camarones to the south, the Andes mountain range to the east, and the Pacific Ocean to the west. This was under the conditions of Treaty of Ancón, by means of which Chile achieved dominion over the Tarapacá Department, and possession of the provinces of Tacna and Arica for a decade, after which a plebiscite was to be held in 1894 to determine the region's sovereignty, however, it was never carried out. The provisional legal organization would end up working for 50 years, until 1929. During its early years, resistance was at its peak, with some Peruvian military personnel organizing guerrillas, such as Gregorio Albarracín's, of about a hundred men, which were defeated in battle in 1882, with Albarracín and his son being killed in action.

On April 23, 1921, measles in epidemic form was reported in the province, as well as neighboring Antofagasta, occurring among troops. At the same time, smallpox was reported present.

On June 3, 1929 the Treaty of Lima was signed by then Peruvian Representative Pedro José Rada y Gamio and Chilean Representative Emiliano Figueroa Larrain, leading to the effective return of Tacna to Peru at midnight, on the 28th of August 1929, creating the Department of Tacna, and Arica (both the former Peruvian Department as well as some territory of the Department of Tacna ceded by the treaty) was permanently given to Chile, being integrated into the Tarapacá Province, ending the existence of the Chilean Province of Tacna. Nevertheless, even with the border conflict officially over, controversy would continue among nationals of both Peru and Bolivia, who would continue her claims over her lost territories, seeking once again a connection to the ocean with the assistance of international mediators on the issue which is yet to be solved, and continues to this day. The handover had no official ceremony, with some Chilean officials temporarily staying behind to assist Peru regarding the new administration. Nonetheless, the return of the territory was met with ceremonies in Peru, with President Augusto B. Leguía overseeing a military parade in Lima, and church bells ringing in celebration. Some Chilean citizens, who had remained in the province after the handover asked to be repatriated.

Administration
According to a law of December 30, 1927, in the Department of Arica the following communes and sub-delegations were created:

The communes of Arica, Putre, Belén, Codpa and General Lagos, all formed a single municipal group, whose head was be the city of Arica.

In 1930, after remaining a year without belonging to any province after the suppression of the province of Tacna, when part of the homonymous department was annexed to Peru, this department becomes the Province of Tarapacá, as a result of the Treaty of Lima.

See also
Treaty of Ancón
Tacna Province (Chile)

References

1884 establishments in Chile
States and territories disestablished in 1929
States and territories established in 1884
1929 disestablishments in Chile
Former departments of Chile